Hanna Krasnoshlyk (born 6 March 1996) is a Ukrainian diver. She competed in the women's 10 metre platform at the 2016 Summer Olympics, where she finished 16th out of 28 competitors.

References

1996 births
Living people
Divers at the 2016 Summer Olympics
Ukrainian female divers
Olympic divers of Ukraine
Divers at the 2014 Summer Youth Olympics
21st-century Ukrainian women